Bartosz Borowski (3 June 1978 – 10 April 2010) was a Polish activist and representative of the Katyn Families.

He died in the 2010 Polish Air Force Tu-154 crash near Smolensk on 10 April 2010. He was posthumously awarded the Order of Polonia Restituta.

Awards
  Knight's Cross of the Order of Polonia Restituta (2010)

References

1978 births
2010 deaths
Federation of Katyn Families
Knights of the Order of Polonia Restituta
Victims of the Smolensk air disaster